Crime in Israel is low. According to the Israel Police, the general crime rate dropped in 2020, while cyber crimes, domestic violence and sexual abuse incidents rose.

Homicide
In Israel the homicide rate is relatively low: in 2015, there were 2.4 people killed per 100,000 inhabitants (in Switzerland the number is 0.71, in Russia it is 14.9, in South Africa it is 34, in Venezuela it is 49). In 2009, 135 people were murdered in Israel.

The percentage of women killed by their partners who were Arab decreased from 9 out of 11 in 2009 to 10 out of 15 in 2010 and 11 out of 24 in 2011.

According to Israel's police, the number of murders is continually decreasing. In 2018, 103 people were the victims of homicide, compared with 136 people in 2017. The murder rate in 2018 was 1.14 people per 100,000 inhabitants

Hate crimes 
Racist incidents, including violence, continue taking place between the Jewish majority and Arab minority. Arab–Jewish race riots have occurred on several occasions.

In September 2007, eight white supremacists sporting tattoos including the number 88 (code for "Heil Hitler" because "H" is the eighth letter of the alphabet) from Petah Tikva were arrested after a year of being observed desecrating synagogues, giving Nazi salutes in the street, attacking religious Jews, collecting weapons explosives and spreading Nazi propaganda and making a video. They were immigrants from Russia, and only one was fully Jewish. The rest had been allowed to immigrate due to some Jewish ancestry, but were not fully Jewish.

According to Palestinian officials, between 2005 and 2015, there were 11,000 attacks on Palestinians by Jews in the West Bank and in east Jerusalem, including price tag attacks. Between 2010 and 2015, three Palestinians were killed in arson attacks. Arson attacks on property were reported for 15 individual houses, 20 mosques and four churches. In first four months of 2018, there were 13 cases of hate crimes carried out by ultra-nationalists against Palestinians.

Property crimes
Director of the Latin American Institute of the American Jewish Committee in Washington, D.C. Dina Siegel, criminology professor H. G. van de Bunt, and lecturer in criminology Damián Zaitch showed in their book Global Organized Crime  that a significant amount of crime in Israel, especially property crime, is committed by the residents of the Palestinian National Authority (PNA or PA).

Motor vehicle theft is a major crime committed by Palestinians. Since the early 1990s, there has been an increase in the rate of robberies in Israel. Between 1994 and 2001, the rate of robberies increased from 14.0 to 30.6 cases per 100,000 population. The reason behind this increase in robberies is analyzed as a result of the establishment of the Palestinian Authority in the West Bank and Gaza Strip which according to the book Global Organized Crime "serves as a safe haven for Palestinian offenders". However, the organized crime industry associated with motor vehicle theft involves not only Palestinians, but also Israeli citizens, both Jewish and Arab. The parts of the stolen cars are removed in "chop shops" in the Palestinian territories and then these vehicles are sold in the black market in Israel. Media reports suggest some of these vehicles are even handed over to high-ranking Palestinian Authority officials. It was reported that since the beginning of 2010 through the end of February 2010, the Palestinian Authority police had destroyed 910 stolen cars.

Although Palestinian criminals are involved in organized crime in the country, Siegel et al. suggested one should not conclude that "organized crime in Israel is dominated by Palestinians. Organized crime committed by Jews or other non-Palestinians has been part of the Israeli crime scene for many years".

Organized crime 
Organized crime has increased dramatically in Israel since the 1990s and is described by the BBC and the Israeli Police as a "booming industry". The Israeli organised crime groups have extended their activities in foreign countries like the United States, South Africa, and the Netherlands. According to a report by the Israel Police, drug trafficking, trafficking of women for the purpose of commercial sexual exploitation, illicit gambling, pirate filling stations and real estate are the major forms of crime in the country.

In 2002, the Israel Police documented 464,854 criminal files and non-prosecution cases while the number was 484,688 in 2003. This was an increase of 4.5% over 2002.

Israeli police, according to a Channel 12 report, have claimed there is a conflict of interest between themselves and the Shin Bet when it comes to cracking down on illegal arms and crime in Arab society. The latter works in terms of a mission of "national security" and provides immunity to figures in organized crime who are prepared to act as informants.

Arms trafficking 
Arms trafficking is another form of crime and it is directly associated with terrorism. There are many links between Israeli and Palestinian gangsters that facilitate these ventures.

Juvenile crime 
Violence against minors is also a problem in Israel. In 1999, approximately 7,000 cases of crimes against minors were documented which included physical assault (54%), molestation (37%) and repeated physical victimization (9%). However, Israeli minors are not solely the victims of crime, they are also sometimes the perpetrators. Teenage violence in schools is a problem in Israel; the first major study on teenage crime in the nation by T. Horowitz and M. Amir in 1981 indicated three major forms of violence in Israeli schools: theft, breaking and entering, and vandalism. Studies have suggested that Israeli Arab youth are more violent than Jews in the country, a fact which academics attribute to cultural, social, and economic differences.

Prisons and prison population

According to official data only about a quarter of the prisoners held in Israeli jails are Jews. 73 percent of overall prisoners are non-Jewish security prisoners and criminal prisoners together. The number of Ethiopian-Israeli Jews minors imprisoned in Ofek Prison is approximately 20%, 27 out of 135 minors prisoners and 27 out of 65 Jewish prisoners in this prison.

See also

Israeli mafia
Jewish terrorism
Palestinian terrorism

References

 
Judaism and violence